James Michael McManus (born July 20, 1936) is a retired American professional baseball player whose ten-season career included five games played in Major League Baseball for the Kansas City Athletics and two years (1962–1963) in Japanese baseball (NPB). He was born in Brookline, Massachusetts.

McManus entered pro ball in 1954 in the Detroit Tigers' organization. After four years in the Detroit farm system, on April 3, 1958, he was included as the "player to be named later" in a 13-player off-season trade with the Athletics in which the Tigers obtained second baseman Billy Martin and veteran outfielder Gus Zernial. McManus spent three more years in the minor leagues before Kansas City recalled him in September 1960. He went hitless in his first two at bats as a pinch hitter, then started at first base for the Athletics' final three games of the 1960 regular season, all against his original organization, the Tigers. McManus collected four hits in those three games, including his only extra-base hit and home run, a solo shot struck against Frank Lary on September 30. He ended his MLB career with a .308 batting average (4-for-13) and two runs batted in.

During his two campaigns with the Taiyo Whales of NPB, McManus batted .236 with 20 home runs.

References

External links

1936 births
Living people
American expatriate baseball players in Canada
American expatriate baseball players in Japan
American expatriate baseball players in Nicaragua
Augusta Tigers players
Baseball players from Massachusetts
Birmingham Barons players
Dallas Rangers players
Denver Bears players
Durham Bulls players
Hawaii Islanders players
Idaho Falls Russets players
Kansas City Athletics players
Major League Baseball first basemen
Montreal Royals players
Portland Beavers players
Seattle Rainiers players
Shreveport Sports players
Sportspeople from Brookline, Massachusetts
Taiyō Whales players